The 2014 McDonald's Burnie International was a professional tennis tournament played on outdoor hard courts. It was the twelfth edition of the tournament for the men and the sixth edition for the women. It was part of the 2014 ATP Challenger Tour and the 2014 ITF Women's Circuit, offering a total of $50,000 in prize money in each the men's and women's events. It took place in Burnie, Tasmania, Australia, on 27 January–2 February 2014.

Men's singles main draw entrants

Seeds 

 1 Rankings as of 13 January 2014

Other entrants 
The following players received wildcards into the singles main draw:
  Jacob Grills
  Omar Jasika
  Jarmere Jenkins
  Bradley Mousley

The following players used Protected Ranking to gain entry into the singles main draw:
  Roman Vögeli

The following players received entry from the qualifying draw:
  Ryan Agar
  Harry Bourchier
  Adam Hubble
  Christopher O'Connell

The following player received entry into the singles main draw as a lucky loser:
  Dayne Kelly

Women's singles main draw entrants

Seeds 

 1 Rankings as of 13 January 2014

Other entrants 
The following players received wildcards into the singles main draw:
  Lizette Cabrera
  Tammi Patterson
  Ellen Perez
  Sara Tomic

The following players received entry from the qualifying draw:
  Fiona Ferro
  Rika Fujiwara
  Jessica Moore
  Aleksandrina Naydenova

The following player received entry into the singles main draw as a lucky loser:
  Jasmine Paolini

Champions

Men's singles 

  Matt Reid def.  Hiroki Moriya, 6–3, 6–2

Women's singles 

  Misa Eguchi def.  Elizaveta Kulichkova, 4–6, 6–2, 6–3

Men's doubles 

  Matt Reid /  John-Patrick Smith def.  Toshihide Matsui /  Danai Udomchoke, 6–4, 6–2

Women's doubles 

  Jarmila Gajdošová /  Storm Sanders def.  Eri Hozumi /  Miki Miyamura, 6–4, 6–4

External links 
 

2014
2014 ATP Challenger Tour
2014 ITF Women's Circuit
2014 in Australian tennis